The Lakes Region of New Hampshire is located in the east-central part of the state, south of the White Mountains Region and extending to the Maine border.  It is named for the numerous lakes in the region, the largest of which are Lake Winnipesaukee, Lake Winnisquam, Squam Lake, and Newfound Lake. The area comprises all of Belknap County, the southern portion of Carroll County, the eastern portion of Grafton County, and the northern portions of Strafford County and Merrimack County. The largest municipality is the city of Laconia.

Besides the lakes, there are also two small mountain ranges, the Belknap Mountains which lie to the southwest, and the Ossipee Mountains to the northeast.

The area is a popular tourist destination in the summer time, with the activity peaking during the annual Motorcycle Week and races at Loudon's New Hampshire Motor Speedway. Other tourist destinations include Funspot in Weirs Beach, the Squam Lakes Natural Science Center in Holderness, the children's museum of Center Harbor, Gunstock ski resort and Bank of New Hampshire Pavilion at Meadowbrook, both in Gilford, Castle in the Clouds in Moultonborough, and the town of Wolfeboro, which claims to be the nation's oldest resort town. Lake Winnipesaukee is the largest lake in the state, and is home to numerous vacation homes. Several motion pictures have either been filmed or set in the region, including the 1981 classic, On Golden Pond (filmed on Squam Lake in the town of Holderness) and the 1991 comedy What About Bob?, which was filmed in Virginia but (fictitiously) took place in Wolfeboro.

Lakes 

Below is a partial list of the largest lakes found in the Lakes Region:

Balch Pond
Broad Bay
Crystal Lake
Dan Hole Pond
Great East Lake
Halfmoon Lake
Lake Kanasatka
Little Squam Lake
Lovell Lake
Merrymeeting Lake
Mirror Lake
Newfound Lake
Opechee Bay
Ossipee Lake
Paugus Bay
Pemigewasset Lake
Pine River Pond
Province Lake
Silver Lake
Squam Lake
Sunset Lake
Lake Waukewan
Lake Wentworth
White Oak Pond
Wicwas Lake
Lake Winnipesaukee
Lake Winnisquam

References

External links
Lakes Region at NH Division of Travel and Tourism Development
Satellite view of the Lakes Region on Google Maps
New Hampshire Lakes Association

Regions of New Hampshire
Tourism regions of New Hampshire